Yang Sang-moon (born March 24, 1961) is a retired South Korean professional baseball pitcher who played for the Lotte Giants and Pacific Dolphins.

References

External links 
Career statistics and player information from Korea Baseball Organization

1961 births
Living people
Baseball announcers
Lotte Giants managers
LG Twins managers
Lotte Giants coaches
LG Twins coaches
Pacific Dolphins players
Chungbo Pintos players
Lotte Giants players
South Korean baseball managers
South Korean baseball coaches
South Korean baseball players
KBO League pitchers
Korea University alumni
Busan High School alumni
Sportspeople from Busan
South Korean Buddhists